The 2nd Annual Kids' Choice Sports was held on July 16, 2015, at the Pauley Pavilion in Los Angeles, California. Super Bowl Champion quarterback Russell Wilson of the Seattle Seahawks was the host of the show, which is meant to celebrate kids’ favorites in the sports world. The show aired on Nickelodeon from 8 p.m. to 9:30 p.m. ET/PT. On its original air date, the award show was preceded by a brand new episode of SpongeBob SquarePants and followed by the premiere of Pig Goat Banana Cricket.

Sports Council
A Kids' Choice Sports Council was formed to "lend their expertise and experience to help inform the awards show, consult on the nominee process and give feedback on categories." 
Committee members are:
 Baron Davis (former New York Knicks and two-time NBA All-Star)
 Ken Griffey Jr. (former baseball outfielder and 13-time All-Star)
 Lisa Leslie (former WNBA MVP and four-time Olympic gold medal winner)
 Cal Ripken Jr. (former shortstop and third baseman for the Baltimore Orioles and 19-time All-Star)
 Deion Sanders (NFL Pro Football Hall of Famer)
 Misty May-Treanor (three-time Olympic beach volleyball gold medalist)
 Andy Elkin (Agent, Creative Artists Agency)
 Tracy Perlman (VP Entertainment Marketing and Promotions, NFL)
 Jeff Schwartz (President and Founder, Excel Sports Management)
 Jill Smoller (SVP, William Morris Endeavor)
 Leah Wilcox (VP, Talent Relations, NBA)
 Alan Zucker (SVP, IMG Clients Group)
 Michael Phelps (most decorated Olympian of all time)
 Tony Hawk (professional skateboarder)
 Zane Stoddard (VP, Entertainment Marketing and Content Development, NASCAR)

Host
Russell Wilson

Presenters and Guests
U.S. Women's National Soccer Team
Nick Cannon
Mo'ne Davis
Dude Perfect
DeMarco Murray
Gracie Gold
Andre Drummond
Lindsey Vonn
Michael Strahan
Carmelo Anthony
Marshawn Lynch
Candace Parker
Ashley Wagner
Erin Andrews
Draymond Green
Klay Thompson
Abby Wambach
Carli Lloyd
Ciara
Stephen Curry

Legend Award
Former New York Yankees shortstop Derek Jeter was the recipient of the Legend Award. The award itself is similar to the signature orange blimp the other winners receive, with the difference being that this award is painted a golden color, then got hit with a metallic gold sliming, from a larger version of the Yankees logo.

Winners and nominees

Best Male Athlete
 Stephen Curry (NBA, Golden State Warriors)
 LeBron James (NBA, Cleveland Cavaliers)
 Clayton Kershaw (MLB, Los Angeles Dodgers)
 Rory McIlroy (PGA Tour and PGA European)
 Lionel Messi (Spanish Club FC Barcelona and Argentina Men’s National Team)
 Aaron Rodgers (NFL, Green Bay Packers)
 Mike Trout (MLB, Los Angeles Angels)
 Russell Wilson (NFL, Seattle Seahawks)

Best Female Athlete
 Stacy Lewis (LPGA)
 Alex Morgan (USWNT and NWSL, Portland Thorns FC) Maya Moore (WNBA, Minnesota Lynx)
 Candace Parker (WNBA, Los Angeles Sparks)
 Danica Patrick (NASCAR)
 Maria Sharapova (WTA)
 Abby Wambach (USWNT)
 Serena Williams (WTA)

Favorite Newcomer
 José Abreu (MLB, Chicago White Sox)
 Odell Beckham Jr. (NFL, New York Giants)
 Malcolm Butler (NFL, New England Patriots)
 Joey Logano (NASCAR)
 Amy Purdy (Professional Snowboarder)
 Jordan Spieth (PGA)
 Mikaela Shiffrin (Professional Alpine Ski Racer)
 Andrew Wiggins (NBA, Minnesota Timberwolves)

Hands Of Gold
 Odell Beckham Jr. (NFL, New York Giants)
 Dez Bryant (NFL, Dallas Cowboys)
 Rob Gronkowski (NFL, New England Patriots)
 Henrik Lundqvist (NHL, New York Rangers)
 Andrew McCutchen (MLB, Pittsburgh Pirates)
 Carey Price (NHL, Montreal Canadiens)
 Pekka Rinne (NHL, Nashville Predators)
 Mike Trout (MLB, Los Angeles Angels)

Clutch Player of the Year
 Stephen Curry (NBA, Golden State Warriors)
 Rob Gronkowski (NFL, New England Patriots)
 DeMarco Murray (NFL, Philadelphia Eagles)
 Marshawn Lynch (NFL, Seattle Seahawks)
 Maya Moore (WNBA, Minnesota Lynx)
 Alexander Ovechkin (NHL, Washington Capitals)
 Cristiano Ronaldo (Real Madrid C.F. and the Portugal national team)
 Abby Wambach (USWNT)

Sickest Moves
 Sidney Crosby (NHL, Pittsburgh Penguins)
 Stephen Curry (NBA, Golden State Warriors)
 Novak Djokovic (ATP)
 Blake Griffin (NBA, Los Angeles Clippers)
 Gabriel Medina (Professional Surfer)
 Lionel Messi (FC Barcelona and Argentina national team)
 Ronda Rousey (UFC)
 Ashley Wagner (US Figure Skating)

Don't Try This At Home Award
 Danny Davis (Professional Snowboarder)
 Kelly Clark (Professional Snowboarder)
 Dale Earnhardt Jr. (NASCAR)
 Nyjah Huston (Professional Skateboarder)
 Travis Pastrana (Motorsports)
 Lindsey Vonn (Professional Alpine Ski Racer)

Most Enthusiastic Player
 Novak Djokovic (ATP)
 Gabby Douglas (USA Gymnastics)
 Rob Gronkowski (NFL, New England Patriots)
 Dwight Howard (NBA, Houston Rockets)
 Cam Newton (NFL, Carolina Panthers)
 Aaron Rodgers (NFL, Green Bay Packers)
 J. J. Watt (NFL, Houston Texans)
 Serena Williams (WTA)

King of Swag
 Carmelo Anthony (NBA, New York Knicks)
 Roger Federer (ATP)
 Rickie Fowler (PGA)
 LeBron James (NBA, Cleveland Cavaliers)
 Cam Newton (NFL, Carolina Panthers)
 Chris Paul (NBA, Los Angeles Clippers)
 Cristiano Ronaldo (Real Madrid C.F. and the Portugal national team)
 Russell Wilson (NFL, Seattle Seahawks)

Queen of Swag
 Skylar Diggins (WNBA, Tulsa Shock)
 Lolo Jones (USA Track and Field and Bobsled)
 Alex Morgan (USWNT and NWSL, Portland Thorns FC) 
 Ronda Rousey (UFC)
 Maria Sharapova (WTA)
 Serena Williams (WTA)

Biggest Cannon
 Drew Brees (NFL, New Orleans Saints)
 Andrew Luck (NFL, Indianapolis Colts)
 Peyton Manning (NFL, Denver Broncos)
 Rafael Nadal (ATP)
 David Ortiz (MLB, Boston Red Sox)
 Mike Trout (MLB, Los Angeles Angels)
 Serena Williams (WTA)
 Russell Wilson (NFL, Seattle Seahawks)

Biggest Powerhouse
 Prince Fielder (MLB, Texas Rangers)
 Blake Griffin (NBA, Los Angeles Clippers)
 LeBron James (NBA, Cleveland Cavaliers)
 '''Marshawn Lynch (NFL, Seattle Seahawks)
 David Ortiz (MLB, Boston Red Sox)
 Ronda Rousey (UFC)
 J. J. Watt (NFL, Houston Texans)
 Serena Williams (WTA)

References

External links
Nick.com's Official Kids' Choice Sports website
Nick.com's Official Kids' Choice Awards website

Sports
Kids' Choice Sports
Kids' Choice Sports
Kids' Choice Sports
2015 in Los Angeles
July 2015 sports events in the United States